Cerreto Guidi is a comune (municipality) in the Metropolitan City of Florence in the Italian region Tuscany, located about  west of Florence.

Cerreto Guidi borders the following municipalities: Empoli, Fucecchio, Lamporecchio, Larciano, San Miniato, Vinci.

References

External links

 Official website

Cities and towns in Tuscany